Soner Sarıkabadayı (born 8 December 1978) is a Turkish pop music singer and songwriter.

Early life 
Soner Sarıkabadayı was born on 8 December 1978 in the Province of Kahramanmaraş Province. Güngör is his mother and Hassan is his father. He has two brothers named perihan and Zafer. Soner Sarıkabadayı lived with his family until the age of 4 in Kahramanmaras, then moved to Mersin Susanoğlu Çıtak. He completed Elementary, middle school and high school education in Mersin.

Discography

Albums
 Kara (2001)
 Trio (2012)

EPs
 Pas (2010)
 İtiraz (2011)
 O Konu (feat. Röya Ayxan) (2017)
 Akustikler 1 (2019)

Singles
 "Buz" (2009)
 "Sadem" (2010)
 "Seveni Arıyorum" (2011)
 "Tuzlu Su + İtiraz" (2011)
 "Tuzlu Su Akustik" (2011)
 "İnsan Sevmez Mi?" (2012)
 "Kutsal Toprak" (2013)
 "Yara Bandı" (2014)
 "Unuttun Mu Beni" (feat. Ozan Çolakoğlu) (2015)
 "Taş" (2016)
 "Bitanem Deme Bitanem" (2016)
 "Tekamül" (2017)
 "Gel De Uyu" (2017)
 "Boza Boza" (2018)
 "Tarifi Zor" (2018)
 "Nerede Kalmıştık?" (2019)
 "Ölümüne" (2020)
 "Delalım" (2020)
 "Kolay Olmayacak" (2020)
 "Bi Sen Gibisi" (2020)
 "Rahat Rahat" (2020)
 "Tamamlayamayabiliyorum" (2021)
 "Pir" (2022)
 "Tarifi Zor (Bağlama Version)" (2022)
 "Kendileri" (2022)

References

External links 
 Soner Sarıkabadayı
 Soner Sarıkabadayı on iTunes
 Soner Sarıkabadayı on Spotify

1978 births
People from Kahramanmaraş
Turkish composers
Turkish lyricists
Turkish pop singers
Living people
21st-century Turkish singers